Staines Rural District was a rural district of Middlesex in England from 1894 to 1930.

It was created in 1894 replacing the 1875-created Staines rural sanitary district.  It co-governed with varying degrees of input from the civil parish councils and functions increasingly came to be carried out by the newly created Middlesex County Council from 1888:

Ashford
Cranford
East Bedfont also known as Bedfont
Feltham
Hanworth
Harlington
Harmondsworth
Laleham
Littleton
Shepperton
Stanwell (including until 1990 a very small part of Colnbrook with Poyle).
Hanworth

It was named after Staines, the urban district of which bordered it to the west, and bordered that of Sunbury to the south-east. Feltham became an independent urban district in 1904 so for the following 26 years the parish of Hanworth was an exclave of the district surrounded by five Urban Districts. The rural district was divided up among existing urban districts in 1930. It covered over half of medieval Spelthorne Hundred one of six divisions of the historic county Middlesex.

Staines Rural Sanitary District
Sunbury-on-Thames and Staines civil parishes in the former Sanitary District saw the Staines Rural Sanitary District's very slow progress in installing drainage as backward.  Indeed, the ineffective taxation and implementation of many such bodies was one of the main prompts for members of Parliament supporting the Local Government Act 1894, which introduced a second tier of local government six years after the deemed success of the administrative county introduction in 1888.  Rate-raising and well-managed foul sewer and surface water drain construction was swift in the two Urban Districts and in the Rural District from 1894.

Example of constraints
Until 1930 the separation of church and state was gradual in this District as this extract from an account of Stanwell's local government history shows:

Successors

Immediate
The district was abolished in 1930 when its civil parishes were re-allocated as follows:

From 1 April 1965
Feltham, Hanworth, Cranford (east), (East) Bedfont: London Borough of Hounslow
Within Stanwell the former manor of Poyle: Borough of Slough
Harlington (including former west Cranford) and Harmondsworth: London Borough of Hillingdon 
Remainder: Borough of Spelthorne in Surrey

References

Districts of England created by the Local Government Act 1894
History of local government in London (1889–1965)
History of local government in Middlesex
Rural districts of England